John Millman was the defending champion but decided not to participate.
Matt Reid defeated Hiroki Moriya 6–3, 6–2 in the final to win the title.

Seeds

Draw

Finals

Top half

Bottom half

References
 Main Draw
 Qualifying Draw

McDonald's Burnie International - Singles
2014 Singles
McDonald's Burnie International - Men's Singles